The Model 1850 Army Staff and Field Officer's Sword was carried by all members of staff departments, Field Grade officers of Artillery and Infantry, Company Grade Officers of Light Artillery, Staff Officers and Aides-de-Camp between 1850 and 1872. It was based on a French pattern.

Though other swords were allowed by the regulations, this model was by far the most popular sword carried by officers during the American Civil War. During the years before the war, many Confederate officers, including General Robert E. Lee carried this sword in the Indian campaigns. Although intended for officers of the rank of major and above, since swords were items of private purchase and not government issue, there was nothing to stop officers of any rank from owning one. The Staff and Field Officers' Sword is distinct from the Model 1850 Army Foot Officer's Sword.

References

External links
 James Morrow, The Uniforms, Weapons & Accouterments during the American Civil War

American Civil War weapons
Swords of the United States
Ceremonial weapons